

367001–367100 

|-bgcolor=#f2f2f2
| colspan=4 align=center | 
|}

367101–367200 

|-bgcolor=#f2f2f2
| colspan=4 align=center | 
|}

367201–367300 

|-bgcolor=#f2f2f2
| colspan=4 align=center | 
|}

367301–367400 

|-id=392
| 367392 Zeri ||  || Federico Zeri (1921–1998) was an Italian art historian and expert in Italian Renaissance painting, known for his art collections, newspaper contributions and TV appearances. || 
|}

367401–367500 

|-id=404
| 367404 Andreasrebers ||  || Andreas Rebers (born 1958) is a German award-winning cabaret artist, author and musician. He is well known for his satirical stage performances. || 
|-id=406
| 367406 Buser ||  || Elisabeth Buser (born 1959) has been operating a sewing workshop for women from a nearby center for asylum seekers at her home in Winterthur-Hegi for over 10 years. She does this volunteer work on her own initiative. As a mother of six children, she also works as a lollipop lady, helping school children cross the road safely. || 
|-id=436
| 367436 Siena ||  || Siena, an Italian city in the region of Tuscany. || 
|-id=488
| 367488 Aloisortner ||  || Alois Ortner (1938–2019), an optician and amateur astronomer. || 
|}

367501–367600 

|-bgcolor=#f2f2f2
| colspan=4 align=center | 
|}

367601–367700 

|-id=633
| 367633 Shargorodskij ||  || Victor Daniilovich Shargorodskij (born 1939), a well-known Russian expert in the field of quantum-optical systems. || 
|-id=693
| 367693 Montmagastrell ||  || The Catalan village of Santa Maria de Montmagastrell in Spain, and home to the Santa Maria de Montmagastrell Observatory  || 
|}

367701–367800 

|-id=732
| 367732 Mikesimonsen ||  || Mike Simonsen (born 1956), a musician, accomplished horticulturalist, popularizer of astronomy, and a leader in the study of variable stars || 
|}

367801–367900 

|-bgcolor=#f2f2f2
| colspan=4 align=center | 
|}

367901–368000 

|-id=943
| 367943 Duende ||  || The Duende, a race of fairy or goblin-like mythological creature from Iberian folklore. || 
|}

References 

367001-368000